Gvulot (lit. "Borders") is a kibbutz in southern Israel. Located in the north-western Negev desert, it falls under the jurisdiction of Eshkol Regional Council. Gvulot is located about 120 m above sea level.

History
The village was established on land owned by the Jewish National Fund (JNF) on 12 May 1943 by immigrants from Romania and Turkey, who were members of the "Kibbutz Eretz Israel Gimel" group of Hashomer Hatzair, with financial assistance from Keren Hayesod. Initially named Mitzpe Gvulot (lit. Borders lookout), it was the first of the three lookouts, the others being Beit Eshel and Revivim. It was the second modern Jewish settlement in the Negev and the first in the Gaza area. Its purpose was to guard JNF land, as well as to research the soil and climate of the region and assess their suitability for agriculture.

It was recognised as a kibbutz in 1946. Before the 1948 Arab–Israeli War it was divided into two—a small cluster of families in its post-war location, and the rest in the nearby military base. During the war, the base served the 8th Brigade. After the war, in 1949, all the residents moved to Gvulot's present location, about 1.5 km south of the base.

Duran Duran lead singer Simon Le Bon worked on Kibbutz Gvulot. While here he wrote early lyrics for "Careless Memories", “The Chaffeur”, "Sound of Thunder", "Tel Aviv".

References

External links
Official website 
 

Kibbutzim
Kibbutz Movement
Populated places established in 1943
Populated places in Southern District (Israel)
Romanian-Jewish culture in Israel
Turkish-Jewish culture in Israel
1943 establishments in Mandatory Palestine